This is a list of programs broadcast by RecordTV, a Brazilian television network.

Current programs

News 
Balanço Geral (2007–present)
Câmera em Ação (2012–present)
Câmera Record (2008–present)
Cidade Alerta (1995–2005; 2011; 2012–present)
Domingo Espetacular (2004–present)
Fala Brasil (1990–present)
Jornal da Record (1972–present)
Praça no Ar (2004-present)
Repórter Record (1995–2010; 2011–present)

Telenovelas 
Chamas da Vida (rerun; 2022–present)
Reis (2022–present)
Amor sem Igual (rerun; 2022–presente)

TV series 
Alphas (2014–present)
Bates Motel (2014–present)
Breaking Bad (2014–present)
Chicago Fire (2014–present)
Chicago P.D. (2015–present)
CSI: Cyber (2015–present)
Grimm (2013–present)
House M.D. (2007–present)
Monk (2006–present)
Once Upon a Time (2014–present)
Outsourced (2012–present)
Spartacus (2014–present)

Reality shows

Varieties and game shows

Children's programs
Woody Woodpecker (2006–present)

Film
Cine Aventura
Cine Maior
Super Tela

Sports championships
1984 Summer Olympics
1986 FIFA World Cup
1996 Summer Olympics
1998 FIFA World Cup
UEFA Euro 2004
UEFA Euro 2008
UEFA Champions League
UEFA Cup
2007 Pan American Games
2010 Winter Olympics
2010 South American Games
2010 World Figure Skating Championships
2010 Summer Youth Olympics
2011 Pan American Games
2012 Summer Olympics
2014 Winter Olympics
2014 South American Games
2015 Pan American Games
2016 Summer Olympics
2019 Pan American Games
Torneio Rio-São Paulo
Campeonato Carioca
Campeonato Catarinense
Campeonato Baiano
Campeonato Brasileiro
Copa do Brasil
Copa Sudamericana
International Champions Cup
Campeonato Paulista
Campeonato Cearense
Campeonato Sergipano

Current schedule 
 News
 Local news
 Variety and Talk shows
 Series
 Telenovelas
 Other

Morning

Afternoon

Evening

Upcoming programming 
 A Fazenda 8 (reality - 2015)
 A Lei e o Crime Season 2 (series - 2015)
 Escrava Mãe  (telenovela - 2015)
 Got Talent Brasil (reality - 2015)
 Milagres de Jesus Season 2  (series - 2015)
 Na Mira do Crime (series - 2015)
 Plano Alto Season 2 (series - 2015)
 RecorDorama
 RecordSerye
 Power Couple Brasil (reality - 2015)
 Sem Volta (series - 2015)
 Girlstuff/Boystuff (animated - 13 september, 2021)

References

External links 
 
 Current RecordTV schedule

 
RecordTV
Original programming by Brazilian television network or channel